The 2000 Major League Baseball postseason was the playoff tournament of Major League Baseball for the 2000 season. The winners of the League Division Series would move on to the League Championship Series to determine the pennant winners that face each other in the World Series. 

In the American League, the New York Yankees returned to the postseason for the sixth straight time, the Chicago White Sox made their second appearance in the last seven years, the Seattle Mariners returned for the third time in six years, and the Oakland Athletics returned for the third time in eleven years. 

In the National League, the Atlanta Braves made their ninth straight appearance in the postseason, the St. Louis Cardinals and San Francisco Giants both returned for the second time in five years, and the New York Mets returned for the second straight year. This postseason was notable in that it was the first time that both #1 seeds from the American and National Leagues failed to make it past the LDS.

The postseason began on October 3, 2000, and ended on October 26, 2000, with the Yankees defeating the Mets in five games in the 2000 World Series, also known as the "Subway Series" as both teams were from New York City. The Yankees completed a three-peat and won their 26th title in franchise history.

Playoff seeds
The following teams qualified for the postseason:

American League
 Chicago White Sox - 95–67, Clinched AL Central
 Oakland Athletics - 91–70, Clinched AL West
 New York Yankees - 87–74, Clinched AL East
 Seattle Mariners - 91–71, Clinched Wild Card

National League
 San Francisco Giants - 97–65, Clinched NL West
 St. Louis Cardinals - 95–67, Clinched NL Central
 Atlanta Braves - 95–67, Clinched NL East
 New York Mets - 94–68, Clinched Wild Card

Playoff bracket

American League Division Series

(1) Chicago White Sox vs. (4) Seattle Mariners 

The Mariners upset the top-seeded White Sox in a sweep to return to the ALCS for the first time since 1995. The Mariners, on the road, took Game 1 in extra innings to secure the home field advantage, then stole Game 2 to go back to Seattle one game away from the ALCS. The Mariners narrowly defeated the White Sox by one run to advance to the next round.

This was the last postseason appearance by the White Sox until 2005, where they went on to win the World Series.

(2) Oakland Athletics vs. (3) New York Yankees 

This was the first postseason meeting between these two teams since the 1981 ALCS, which the Yankees won in a sweep en route to the World Series. The Yankees once again defeated the Athletics, this time in five games, to return to the ALCS for the fourth time in five years. These two teams would meet again in the ALDS next year, which the Yankees also won.

National League Division Series

(1) San Francisco Giants vs. (4) New York Mets 

This was the first postseason meeting between the Giants and Mets. The Mets defeated the top-seeded Giants in four games to advance to the NLCS for the second year in a row. This marked the first time in postseason history that both #1 seeds fell in the LDS. Both teams would meet again in the 2016 NL Wild Card Game, which the Giants won in a shutout.

(2) St. Louis Cardinals vs. (3) Atlanta Braves 

This was the third postseason meeting between the Cardinals and Braves. They previously met in the NLCS in 1996, which the Braves won in seven games after trailing in the series three games to one. The Cardinals swept the series, and denied the Braves a ninth straight trip to the NLCS. The series was not close - while the Cardinals took Game 1 by a 7-5 score, they blew out the Braves in Games 2 and 3 to advance to the next round.

The Cardinals and Braves would meet in the postseason two more times - in the Wild Card game in 2012, and the NLDS in 2019, both won by the Cardinals.

American League Championship Series

(3) New York Yankees vs. (4) Seattle Mariners 

This was the first postseason meeting between these two teams since the 1995 ALDS, which the Mariners won after being down two games to none in the series. The Yankees defeated the Mariners in six games, and returned to the World Series for the fourth time in five years. 

The Mariners stole Game 1 on the road, but the Yankees blew out the Mariners in Game 2 to even the series going into Seattle. In Game 3, the Yankees again blew out the Mariners, and then shut them out in Game 4, 5-0, to go up three games to one. The Mariners won Game 5 to send the series back to the Bronx for Game 6, which the Yankees narrowly won in a high-scoring affair to secure the pennant.

Both teams would meet again in the ALCS next year, which the Yankees also won.

National League Championship Series

(2) St. Louis Cardinals vs. (4) New York Mets

This was the first postseason meeting between the Mets and Cardinals. The Mets defeated the Cardinals in five games to return to the World Series for the first time since 1986. 

The Mets stole Games 1 and 2 in St. Louis to go up 2-0 in the series heading back to Queens. In Game 3, the Cardinals blew out the Mets to avoid a sweep. However, the Mets responded by winning Game 4 by a 10-6 score, and then blew out the Cardinals in a 7-0 shutout to secure the pennant.

Both teams would meet again in the 2006 NLCS, which the Cardinals won in seven games en route to a World Series title.

The Cardinals returned to the NLCS in 2002, but they fell to the San Francisco Giants in five games. They would win their next NL pennant in 2004, against the Houston Astros in seven games. This was the last time the Mets won the NL pennant until 2015, where they swept the Chicago Cubs before falling in the World Series.

2000 World Series

(AL3) New York Yankees vs. (NL4) New York Mets 

This was the first World Series to feature two teams from New York since 1956, and the first to feature two teams from the same state since 1989. The Yankees defeated the Mets in five games to complete a three-peat, becoming the first team since the 1972-74 Oakland Athletics to accomplish such a feat (the Athletics, ironically, also beat the Mets during their dynasty run, in 1973). 

In the Bronx, the Yankees took Game 1 after 12 innings of play. During Game 2, minor controversy occurred when a pitch from Roger Clemens shattered Mike Piazza's bat. The ball went foul, but a sharp edge of the bat came towards Clemens. He came off the mound and threw the bat towards the baseline, almost hitting the running Piazza. Piazza appeared baffled by Clemens' actions. After the game, Clemens would say he did not see Piazza running and threw the bat because he was pumped up with nervous energy and initially charged the incoming broken bat, believing it to be the ball. The Yankees won Game 2 by a narrow 6-5 score to go up 2-0 in the series. When the series shifted to Queens for Game 3, the Mets prevailed by a 4-2 score to avoid a sweep. However, the Yankees narrowly prevailed in Games 4 and 5 to secure the title and cap off a three-peat. Game 5 was the last World Series game ever played at Shea Stadium.

This would be the last World Series appearance for the Mets until 2015, where they lost to the Kansas City Royals in five games. The Yankees returned to the World Series again the next year in hopes to win a fourth straight title, but fell to the Arizona Diamondbacks in seven games. The Yankees' next title would come in 2009, where they defeated the Philadelphia Phillies in six games in the World Series.

References

External links
 League Baseball Standings & Expanded Standings - 2000

 
Major League Baseball postseason